The Apprentice New Zealand was a New Zealand reality television series that aired on TV2 16 February to 11 May 2010. It features Terry Serepisos, Wellington
based multi-millionaire property developer, as the chief executive officer (CEO).  The series' winner, Thomas Ben, received a $200,000 package consisting of a $100,000 salary, A BMW and accommodation. Thomas began work at Serepisos' property development company Century City in July 2010. The series returned in 2021, under the title The Apprentice Aotearoa.

Candidates
There were fourteen candidates taking part in this season and initially they were separated into two teams based on gender. The women chose the name Athena (also used as the female team name in the eighth season of the U.S. show), while the men chose the name Number 8. In the first episode, there is a twist as Nicky (Athena) and Richard (Number 8) are revealed to be already in a relationship. In episode 4, the teams picked project managers for the task Nicky and Chris and then were told that they would swap and lead the other team. In the boardroom in episode 6 Richard was switched to team Athena due to his excellence in the task even though his team lost. In episode 9 Nicky and Linda who had starring roles in the previous task had to select one member from their own team without conferring to switch to the other team, Linda chose Karen and Nicky chose David. In Week 11 Catherine and Karen swapped teams because they had not worked with the other person.

Weekly results

 The candidate was on the losing team.
 The candidate was hired and won the competition. Was later fired due to the Bankruptcy of Terry Serepisos.
 The candidate won as project manager on his/her team.
 The candidate lost as project manager on his/her team.
 The candidate was brought to the final boardroom.
 The candidate was fired.
 The candidate lost as project manager and was fired.
 The candidate lost as project manager and resigned.

Challenges

Week 1
Air Date: 16 February 2010
Project managers:  Kim (Athena) and David (Number 8)
Task: To sell BBQ'd food in Auckland city centre. The team that makes the most profit wins
Result: Athena made a $511.50 profit against Number 8's $711.00
Winner: Number 8
Reward: Dinner at Dine by Peter Gordon
Brought into the boardroom: Kim, Catherine and Kirsty
Fired: Kim Laurenson
Reasons for firing: For poor leadership and bringing Kirsty back for seemingly no reason.

Week 2
Air Date: 23 February 2010
Project managers:  Daniel (Number 8) and Karen (Athena)
Task: Put on a fashion show which exhibits the latest innovation in women's underwear from jockey; the next generation of the no panty line promise range
Result: Number 8 win the creativity and originality part of the task but Athena win the presentation side of the challenge and the overall brand integration.
Winner: Athena
Reward: Taking a helicopter to the 140 ft super catamaran Island Passage
Brought into the boardroom: Daniel, Lee and Paul
Fired: Lee Davies
Reasons for firing: For his arrogance, not listening to his teammates and lack of professionalism by drinking on the task.

Week 3
Air Date: 2 March 2010
Project managers:  Kirsty (Athena) and Thomas (Number 8)
Task: To sell new Magnum Ice Cream Sandwich Auckland city centre. The team that makes the most profit wins
Result: Athena made a $1,071.30 profit against Number 8's $1,490.00
Winner: Number 8
Reward: Number 8 get to go bungy jumping with Tamati Coffey
Brought into the boardroom: Kirsty, Karen and Nicky
Fired: Kirsty Parkhill
Reasons for firing: For a lack of leadership & control over Athena.

Week 4
Air Date: 9 March 2010
Team reshuffle: Nicky and Chris switched teams.
Project managers:  Chris (Athena) and Nicky (Number 8)
Task: To create an online marketing campaign for a Microsoft product.
Result: Number 8 won all five categories in the task.
Winner: Number 8
Reward: Pampering at East Day Spa
Brought into the boardroom: Chris, Catherine and Karen
Fired: Chris Whiteside
Reasons for firing: For lying, being a poor leader and showing the competition his team's presentation.

Week 5
Air Date: 16 March 2010
Project managers:  Catherine (Athena) and Richard (Number 8)
Task: To Create and to make a Subway sub to sell to the public of New Zealand.
Winner: Athena
Reward: A free handset from a telecom store, and a 10 minutes phonecall to loved ones/family
Brought into the boardroom: Richard, Paul and David
Fired: No One, Terry felt that both teams had done well on the task.

Week 6
Air Date:  23 March 2010
Project managers:  Linda (Athena) and Paul (Number 8)
Task: To develop a concept and sell a Bus Tour around Auckland.
Winner: Athena
Reward: Watch a Horse Race at Ellerslie Race Course, Richard accompanied Athena on their reward due to being judged as the best performer on Number 8.
Brought into the boardroom: Paul, Daniel and Thomas (Paul honorably took the blame as the leader for Number 8)
Asked to be fired: Paul Natac

Week 7
Air Date: 30 March 2010
Project managers: Richard(Athena) and Nicky(Number 8)
Task: Renovate, Re-Decorate, and Rent an apartment at Lighter Quay.
Winner: Number 8
Reward: A round of golf together with Terry Serepisos and his two assistants
Brought into the boardroom: Catherine, Linda and Meena
Fired: Richard Henry and Meena Chhagan
Reasons for firing: Richard for lying and trying to cover up any actual problems in his team. Meena for lying to Mr. Serepisos' face despite all the candidates being warned they would be fired solely on lying.
Notes: Richard is fired before the results of the task are even revealed. Serepisos stated that he and his advisers "see and hear everything". He warned everyone that he would fire anyone being dishonest. Meena later lied again to Serepisos, and ended up being fired for that sole reason.

Week 8
Air Date: 6 April 2010
Project managers: Karen(Athena) and David(Number 8)
Task: To create a 30-second television commercial for Seek.co.nz.
Winner: Athena by default. Number 8's commercial made use of a competitor's similar slogan and, thus, was disqualified, despite winning all the categories in the task.
Reward: Jet skiing at the beach.
Brought into the boardroom: David, Nicky and Daniel
Fired: Daniel Phillips
Reasons for firing: For someone who works in the advertising agency, Daniel should have been able to pick up on the similarity of the slogans.

Week 9
Air Date: 13 April 2010
Project managers: Catherine(Athena) and Thomas(Number 8)
Task: To create a Cereal brand for NZ kids
Winner: Athena
Reward: Ferrari Riding at the Hampton Downs Racecourse, Near Auckland
Brought into the boardroom: Thomas, Karen and Nicky
Fired: Nicky Clarke
Reasons for firing: Serepisos felt that she didn't want it as much as the others.

Week 10
Air Date: 20 April 2010
Project managers: Karen(Number 8) and Linda(Athena)
Task: To sell bottled water (a brand product of Richie McCaw and Ali Williams)
Winner: Number 8
Reward: $4500 to spend at Sony Centre, New Market
Brought into the boardroom: Linda, Catherine and David
Fired: Linda Slade
Reasons for firing: For poor leadership, not selling enough water and allowing herself to become distracted by Richie McCaw.

Week 11
Air Date: 27 April 2010
Project managers: Thomas (Number 8) and David (Athena)
Task: To Teach Elderly People how to use the newest technology
Winner: Number 8
Reward: One night at a luxury hotel and 1 phone call to their loved one
Brought into the boardroom: David and Karen
Fired: Karen Reid
Reasons for firing: Despite being honest and outspoken, Karen is not seen as a team player based on her interactions with her teammates.

Week 12 (Finale, Part 1)
Air Date: 4 May 2010
Fired: Catherine Livingstone (fired prior to task)
Reasons for firing: Terry felt she was a bit too untrustworthy to work for him.
Task (Part 1): To sell a luxury apartment
Winner: Thomas Ben

Week 13 (Finale, Part 2)

Air Date: 9 May 2010
Task (Part 2): To organize a charity fundraising auction for (Cure Kids).
Thomas's Team: Nicky, Paul, Catherine
David's Team: Daniel, Linda, Karen
Fired: David Wyatt
The Apprentice: Thomas Ben

References

External links
Official Website – TV2

New Zealand
2010 New Zealand television seasons
2010 New Zealand television series debuts
2010 New Zealand television series endings
New Zealand reality television series
New Zealand television series based on British television series